John Averell was an Irish bishop in the third quarter of the 18th century.
 
A former Dean of Emly, Averell was Dean of Limerick from 1766 until 1770. He was nominated Bishop of Limerick, Ardfert and Aghadoe on 14 December 1770 and consecrated on 6 January the following year. He died on 14 September 1771.

References

18th-century Anglican bishops in Ireland
Deans of Emly
Deans of Limerick
Bishops of Limerick, Ardfert and Aghadoe
1771 deaths
Year of birth unknown
Diocese of Limerick, Ardfert and Aghadoe